"You" is a song by American country music duo Dan + Shay. It was released on July 18, 2022 as the fifth single from their fourth studio album Good Things.

Content
Carena Liptak of Taste of Country describes the song as "sway-along, breezy country pop". According to duo member Shay Mooney, the song was intended to be a lyrical sequel to the duo's earlier single "Speechless". The song was released in late 2022 as the fifth single from the duo's album Good Things. Dan Smyers, the other half of the duo, co-wrote with Dave Barnes and Jordan Reynolds.

Chart performance

References

Warner Records singles
Dan + Shay songs
Songs written by Dan Smyers
Songs written by Dave Barnes
Song recordings produced by Scott Hendricks
2021 songs
2022 singles